The 2015 Seattle Sounders FC 2 season is the club's first year of existence, and their first season in the United Soccer League, the third tier of the United States Soccer Pyramid. Including previous Seattle Sounders franchises, this is the 35th season of a soccer team playing in the Seattle metro area.

Roster

Competitions

USL regular season

Standings

Results summary

Results by matchday

Matches

USL Playoffs

U.S. Open Cup

Recognition 

USL Player of the Week

USL Team of the Week

References

2015 USL season
American soccer clubs 2015 season
2015 in sports in Washington (state)
Soccer in Washington (state)
Tacoma Defiance seasons